Looking for Baami is a 2019 Nigerian drama film written and directed by Biodun Stephen. The film stars Femi Jacobs, Bimbo Ademoye, Akinde Seyi in the lead roles.

Plot

Cast 

 Femi Jacobs as Femi Osinowo
 Bimbo Ademoye as Ajinde (AJ)
 Biodun Stephen
 Tayo Odueke
 Temitayo Awodoyin
 Karen Ajimobi
 Babatola Awelewe,
 Seyi Akinde
 Bolaji Ogunmola

References 

2019 films
2019 drama films
English-language Nigerian films
Films shot in Nigeria
Nigerian drama films
2010s English-language films